Barbodes lindog, known locally as the lindog, is a possibly extinct species of cyprinid fish endemic to Lake Lanao in Mindanao, the Philippines where it prefers shallow, weedy waters of the bays. This species can reach a length of  TL.  It is commercially important to local peoples as a food fish.

References

Barbodes
Fish described in 1924
Taxonomy articles created by Polbot

Freshwater fish of the Philippines
Endemic fauna of the Philippines
Fauna of Mindanao